A lucet is a tool formerly used in cordmaking or braiding to create cords that were used on clothing.

Lucet may also refer to:

 Charles Lucet (1910–90), French ambassador to the United States
 Élise Lucet (born 1963), French investigative journalist and television host
 Marcel Lucet (1816–83), French deputy and then senator of the department of Constantine, Algeria, from 1871 to 1883